Équipe Cascades was a women's cycling team based in Canada that competed in North American road bicycle racing and track cycling events. The Équipe Cascades also competed in UCI events.

2007

Team roster 
  Véronique Labonté
  Geneviève Gauthier
  Johanne Cyr
  Lila Fraser
  Caroline Montminy
  Jessica Burns

External links
  
 

Cycling teams based in Canada
UCI Women's Teams